Streptomyces sulphureus is a bacterium species from the genus of Streptomyces which has been isolated from marine sediments in Dalian in China.

See also 
 List of Streptomyces species

References

Further reading

External links
Type strain of Streptomyces sulphureus at BacDive -  the Bacterial Diversity Metadatabase

sulphureus
Bacteria described in 1953